This is a list of cities and towns in Goa. Goa  is a state located in the south-western region of India; It is India's smallest state by area and the fourth smallest by population. Goa is one of India's richest states with a GDP per capita two and a half times that of the country. It was ranked the best placed state by the Eleventh Finance Commission for its infrastructure and ranked on top for the best quality of life in India by the National Commission on Population based on the 12 Indicators.

Panjim is the state capital of Goa. Vasco da Gama is the largest city. Margao is the commercial capital of Goa, while Ponda is considered the cultural capital of the state. Goa still exhibits the religious and cultural influence of the Portuguese, who ruled Goa from 1510 to 1961.

Subdivisions

The state is divided into two districts: North Goa and South Goa. Each district is administered by a district collector, appointed by the Indian government.

Panaji is the headquarters of North Goa district and is also the capital of Goa.

North Goa is further divided into three subdivisions – Panaji, Mapusa, and Bicholim; and five taluks – Tiswadi (Panaji), Bardez (Mapusa), Pernem, Bicholim, and Sattari (Valpoi),(note = the letter m is silent at the end of ever place/city/taluka)

Margao is the headquarters of South Goa district.

South Goa is further divided into five subdivisions – Ponda, Mormugao (Vasco da Gama), Margao, Quepem, and Dharbandora; and seven taluks – Ponda, Mormugao, Salcete (Margao), Quepem, and Canacona (Chaudi), Sanguem, and Dharbandora. (Ponda Taluka shifted from North Goa to South Goa in January 2015).(note = the letter m is silent at the end of ever place/city/taluka)

Goa's major cities include Vasco da Gama, Margao, Panaji, Mapusa and Ponda.

Panaji is the only Municipal Corporation in Goa.
There are thirteen Municipal Councils: Margao, Mormugao (including Vasco da Gama), Pernem, Mapusa, Bicholim, Sanquelim, Valpoi, Ponda, Cuncolim, Quepem, Curchorem, Sanguem, and Canacona.(note = the letter m is silent at the end of ever place/city/taluka)

Cities in Goa

Urban agglomerations in Goa

References

 
Cities
Goa